Albanian Supercup 2005 is the 12th edition of the Albanian Supercup since its establishment in 1989. The match was contested between the Albanian Cup 2005 winners KS Teuta and the 2004–05 Albanian Superliga champions KF Tirana.

The regular and extra time result ended goalless, therefore the verdict of penalty shoot-outs 5-4 crowned KF Tirana winners of the Supercup for the 5th time, three of these trophies won over the same team, KS Teuta.

Details

See also
 2004–05 Albanian Superliga
 Albanian Cup 2005

References

2005
Supercup
Albanian Supercup, 2005
Albanian Supercup, 2005
Albanian Supercup 2005